The Pacific Electric Railway Company, nicknamed the Red Cars, was a privately owned mass transit system in Southern California consisting of electrically powered streetcars, interurban cars, and buses and was the largest electric railway system in the world in the 1920s. Organized around the city centers of Los Angeles and San Bernardino, it connected cities in Los Angeles County, Orange County, San Bernardino County and Riverside County.

The system shared dual gauge track with the  narrow gauge Los Angeles Railway, "Yellow Car," or "LARy" system on Main Street in downtown Los Angeles (directly in front of the 6th and Main terminal), on 4th Street, and along Hawthorne Boulevard south of downtown Los Angeles toward the cities of Hawthorne, Gardena, and Torrance.

Districts 

The system had four districts:
 Northern District: San Gabriel Valley, including Pasadena, Mount Lowe, South Pasadena, Alhambra, El Monte, Covina, Duarte, Glendora, Azusa, Sierra Madre, and Monrovia.
 Eastern District: Pomona, San Bernardino, Arrowhead Springs, Riverside, Rialto and Redlands in the Inland Empire.
 Southern District: Long Beach, Newport Beach, Huntington Beach, San Pedro via Dominguez, Santa Ana, El Segundo, Redondo Beach via Gardena, and San Pedro Via Torrance.
 Western District: Hollywood, Glendale/Burbank, San Fernando Valley, Beverly Hills, Santa Monica, Manhattan/Redondo/Hermosa Beaches, Venice, Playa Del Rey.

History

Origins 
Electric trolleys first appeared in Los Angeles in 1887. In 1895 the Pasadena & Pacific Railway was created from a merger of the Pasadena and Los Angeles Railway and the Los Angeles Pacific Railway (to Santa Monica.) The Pasadena & Pacific Railway boosted Southern California tourism, living up to its motto "from the mountains to the sea."

The Pacific Electric Railway was created in 1901 by railroad executive Henry E. Huntington and banker Isaias W. Hellman.  As a Vice President of the Southern Pacific Railroad (SP), operated by his uncle, Collis P. Huntington, Huntington had a background in electric trolley lines in San Francisco where he oversaw SP's effort to consolidate many smaller street railroads into one organized network. Hellman, the President of the Nevada Bank, San Francisco's largest, became one of the largest bond holders for these lines and he and the younger Huntington developed a close business relationship. The success of their San Francisco trolley adventure and Hellman's experience in financing some early Los Angeles trolley lines led them to invest in the purchase of some existing downtown Los Angeles lines which they began to standardize and organize into one network called the Los Angeles Railway. When uncle Collis died, Henry lost a boardroom battle for control of the Southern Pacific to Union Pacific President E. H. Harriman.  Huntington then decided to focus his energies on Southern California.

In May 1901, Hellman, who had been Southern California's leading banker for almost three decades (and owned much property down there), wrote Huntington that "the time is at hand when we should commence building suburban railroads out of the city." Hellman added that he had already tasked engineer Epes Randolph to survey and lay out the company's first line which would be to Long Beach. In that same year, Huntington and Hellman incorporated a new entity, the Pacific Electric Railway of California, formed to construct new electric rail lines to connect Los Angeles with surrounding cities. Hellman and his group of investors owned the controlling majority of stock (double that of Huntington's) and the newspapers of the time referred to it as the Huntington-Hellman syndicate. Using surrogates, the syndicate began purchasing property and right-of-ways. The new company's first main project, the line to Long Beach, opened July 4, 1902.

Huntington experienced periods of opposition from organized labor with the construction of the new railways. Tensions between union leaders and like-minded Los Angeles businessmen were high from the early 1900s up through the 1920s. Strikes and boycotts troubled the Pacific Electric throughout those years until they reached the height of violence in the 1919 Streetcar Strike of Los Angeles. The efforts of organized labor simmered with the onset of World War I.

Railroads were one part of the enterprise. Revenue from passenger traffic rarely generated a profit, unlike freight. The real money for the investors was in supplying electric power to new communities and in developing and selling real estate. To get the railways and electricity to their towns, local groups offered the Huntington interest opportunities in local land. Soon Huntington and his partners had significant holdings in the land companies developing Naples, Bay City (Seal Beach), Huntington Beach, Newport Beach and Redondo Beach.

Harriman, who controlled the powerful Southern Pacific Railroad, was concerned with the competition that these new electric lines gave his steam railroad traffic, and had been prodding Huntington for joint ownership of the lines but Huntington refused to negotiate. In early 1903, Harriman proposed a franchise plan with three-cent fare plan to the Los Angeles City Council, a plan which, if accepted, would have handicapped the other railways severely. Huntington countered with a ticket book which gave the rider  of travel for $6.25, which undercut the Harriman strategy. The Council vetoed the franchise idea, unable to believe adequate service could be provided for such a low fare. Then, on April 14, 1903, Harriman bought Hook's Los Angeles Traction Company, which ran lines within the downtown area and, through its California Pacific subsidiary, was constructing a line from Los Angeles to San Pedro.

The final confrontation came over a bidding war for the 6th Street franchise, in which the franchise (thought to be worth maybe $10,000), finally went to the top bidder for $110,000 (equivalent to $ in ), with Harriman the secret winner. In May 1903, Huntington made an overnight trip to San Francisco and worked out an arrangement with Harriman.  The Pacific Electric would get the Los Angeles Traction Lines, SP's San Gabriel Valley Rapid Transit Railway line, the 6th Street franchise, and some downtown trackage. In return, Harriman got 40.3% of PE stock, an amount equal to Huntington's, with Hellman, Borel and De Guigne owning the remaining 20%. Huntington could expand the PE as he saw fit, but he was not to compete with existing SP lines. A byproduct of this sale was that Harriman sold the banking unit of his Wells Fargo Company to Hellman who merged it with his Nevada Bank operations and established the Pacific Coast's largest, most powerful bank.

Construction 

On June 6, 1903, Huntington created the Los Angeles Inter-Urban Railway, capitalized at $10 million (equivalent to $ in ), with plans to extend lines to Santa Ana, Newport Beach, the San Fernando Valley, La Habra, Redlands and Riverside, with branches to Colton and San Bernardino. He simultaneously created the Los Angeles Land Company. Huntington owned almost all the stock in the companies, with token amounts allotted to company directors. Although the company allowed Huntington to proceed with construction plans unencumbered by outside interference, the poor state of the bond market meant that he had to turn to stockholders to finance expansion. In 1904 he acquired and finished the Los Angeles and Glendale Railway.  In June, LAIU assumed control of the Riverside and Arlington Railway and the Santa Ana and Orange Motor Railway, and soon after, PE and LAIU finished their extension to Huntington Beach and began building a line to Covina.

Huntington continued to expand and not declare profits. On December 7, 1904, the Hellman group sold the rest of their shares and bonds in PE and LAIU to Huntington and Harriman for $1.2 million (equivalent to $ in ). Huntington and Harriman were now equal partners in ownership of the Pacific Electric. The Hellman syndicate retained their 45% interest in the Los Angeles Railway, which they thought would eventually declare dividends. 

By 1905, the Newport and Santa Ana lines were completed. In 1906, the Newport line was extended to Balboa, and in late 1906, lines to Sierra Madre and Oak Knoll in Pasadena were finished. The two firms controlled 449 miles of track, with the Pacific Electric at 197 miles and the LAIU, 252 miles. Huntington purchased the Los Angeles and Redondo Railway in July 1905, along with the Redondo Land Company, which owned 90% of the land in the beach community. This announcement precipitated a land boom in the area which resulted in a quick return of Huntington's entire investment in the area and in the railway. 

On March 19, 1906, an agreement was reached to sell control of the Los Angeles Pacific Railroad lines, owned by Moses Sherman and Eli P. Clark, for a reported $6 million to Harriman (equivalent to $ in ); this turned over all the lines in downtown Los Angeles to Santa Monica and down the coast to Redondo Beach to the Southern Pacific. In January 1907, the Hellman syndicate, after seeing that Huntington ran the Los Angeles Railway similarly to PE, continually expanding and not declaring dividends, sold their 45% stake in the Los Angeles Railway to Harriman and the Southern Pacific.

The Covina line was completed in 1907, as well as a line from Monrovia to Glendora. The system reached La Habra in 1908. Routes had been built into or passed through areas just beginning to grow.

1905 was the Pacific Electric's most profitable year, when the road made $90,711 (equivalent to $ in ). Profits from the Huntington Land and Improvement Company made up for the poor earnings of the interurban system, with profits of $151,000 in 1905 rising to $402,000 in 1907 (equivalent to $ and $ in ).  However, in 1909, earnings were only $75,000.

Huntington had begun long negotiations with Harriman about consolidating the Los Angeles electric railways beginning in 1907. There had always been a difference between the two men as to the purpose of the railway, with Huntington seeing the PE as a means to facilitate his real estate efforts, and Harriman seeing it as part of the Southern Pacific's overall transportation system in Southern California. Harriman left Huntington alone until 1910, when the former refused to allow the latter to run a line to San Diego that would have interfered with a competitive arrangement Harriman had worked out with the Santa Fe Railway.

In July 1908, Huntington leased all the lines of the Los Angeles Inter-Urban Railway to Harriman. In 1909 he sold the systems in Fresno and Santa Clara County to the Southern Pacific.  Talks paused after the death of Harriman on September 9, 1909, but resumed in early 1910. On September 27, 1910, Huntington and Southern Pacific management came to a final agreement. In a complicated stock and bond transaction, Huntington conveyed his 50% of Pacific Electric to the Southern Pacific, while he acquired SP's 45% interest in the Los Angeles Railway. In addition, Huntington conveyed the Los Angeles and Redondo Railway to the Southern Pacific. Huntington retained control of the Los Angeles Railway, the narrow gauge street car system known locally as "Yellow Cars," until a controlling interest in this company was sold off by Huntington's estate in 1945.

The Great Merger and the "New" Pacific Electric 

In what was called the "Great Merger" of September 1, 1911, the Southern Pacific created a new Pacific Electric Railway Company, with all electrical operations now under the Pacific Electric name. The constituent railroads were:

 Original "old" PE owned by Huntington
 Los Angeles Inter-Urban Railway
 Los Angeles Pacific Railway
 Los Angeles and Redondo Railway
 San Bernardino Valley Traction Company
 San Bernardino Interurban Railway
 Redlands Central
 Riverside and Arlington Railway Company

It operated to many destinations in Southern California, particularly to the south and east.

The Southern Pacific now began to emphasize freight operations. From 1911, when revenue from freight was $519,226 ($ adjusted for inflation), freight revenue climbed to $1,203,956 in 1915 (equivalent to $ in ), 13% of total revenue.

During the 1920s profits were good and the lines were extended to the Pasadena area, to the beaches at Santa Monica, Del Rey, Manhattan/Redondo/Hermosa Beach and Long Beach in Los Angeles County, and to Newport Beach and Huntington Beach in Orange County. Extra service beyond the normal schedules was provided on weekends, particularly in the late afternoon when passengers wanted to return simultaneously. Comedian Harold Lloyd highlighted the popularity and utility of the system in an extended sequence in his 1924 film Girl Shy, where, after finding one Red Car too crowded, he commandeered another and drove at high speed through the streets of Culver City and Los Angeles.

PE operated frequent freight trains under electric power throughout its service area (as far as ) to Redlands, including operating electrically powered Railway Post Office routes, one of the few U.S. interurbans to do so. This provided important revenue. The PE was responsible for an innovation in grade crossing safety: the automatic electromechanical grade crossing signal, nicknamed the wigwag. This device was quickly adopted by other railroads. A few wigwags continue in operation .

During this period, the Los Angeles Railway provided local streetcar service in central Los Angeles and to nearby communities. These trolleys were known as the "Yellow Cars" and carried more passengers than the PE's "Red Cars" since they ran in the most densely populated portions of Los Angeles, including south to Hawthorne and along Pico Boulevard to near West Los Angeles to terminate at the huge Sears Roebuck store and distribution center (the L.A. Railway's most popular line, the "P" line). The Yellow Cars' unusual narrow gauge PCC streetcars, by now painted MTA two-tone green, continued to operate until the end of rail service in 1963.

Large profits from land development were generated along the routes of the new lines. Huntington Beach was incorporated in 1909 and developed by the Huntington Beach Company, a real-estate development firm owned by Henry Huntington, which still owns both land in the city and most of the mineral rights.

There are other local streetcar suburbs. Angelino Heights was built around the Temple Street horsecar, which was later upgraded to electric streetcar as part of the Yellow Car system. Highland Park was developed along the Figueroa Street trolley lines and railroads linking downtown Los Angeles and Pasadena. Huntington owned nearly all the stock in the Pacific Electric Land Company. West Hollywood was established by Moses Sherman and his partners of the Los Angeles and Pacific Railway. Moses Sherman, Harry Chandler, Hobart Johnstone Whitley, and others bought the entire southern San Fernando Valley in 1910. The electric railway and a $500,000 boulevard called Sherman Way connected the three townsites they were selling. These included Van Nuys, Marion (now Reseda), and Owensmouth (now Canoga Park). Parts of Sherman Way are now called Chandler Boulevard and Van Nuys Boulevard.

The railway company "connected all the dots on the map and was a leading player itself in developing all the real estate that lay in between the dots".

Decline 

Huntington's involvement with urban rail was intimately tied to his real estate development operations. Real estate development was so lucrative for Huntington and SP that they could use the Red Car as a loss leader. However, by 1920, when most of the company's holdings had been developed, their major income source began to deplete. Many rural passenger lines were unprofitable, with losses offset by revenue generated from passenger lines in populated corridors and from freight operations. The least-used Red Car lines were converted to cheaper bus routes as early as 1925. In 1936, Pacific Electric acquired the Motor Transit Company, which operated intercity bus service within Southern California.

In the pre-automobile era, electric interurban rail was the most economical way to connect outlying suburban and exurban parcels to central cities.

Although the railway owned extensive private roadbeds, usually between urban areas, much PE trackage in urban areas such as downtown Los Angeles west of the Los Angeles River was in streets shared with automobiles and trucks. Virtually all street crossings were at-grade, and increasing automobile traffic led to decreasing Red Car speeds on much of its trackage.  At its nadir, the busy Santa Monica Boulevard line, which connected Los Angeles to Hollywood and on to Beverly Hills and Santa Monica, had an average speed of 

Traffic congestion was of such great concern by the late 1930s that the influential Automobile Club of Southern California engineered an elaborate plan to create an elevated freeway-type Motorway System, a key aspect of which was the dismantling of the streetcar lines, replacing them with buses that could run on both local streets and on the new express roads.

When the freeway system was planned in the 1930s the city planners planned to include interurban tracks in the center margin of each freeway but the plan was never implemented. There was one exception that was within the Hollywood Freeway through Cahuenga Pass. The San Fernando Valley line from Hollywood took to the center of the Freeway over the pass and exited at Lankershim Boulevard. When that service was terminated, the freeway was expanded onto the former PE roadbed.

The Whittier & Fullerton line was cut in 1938, Redondo Beach, Newport Beach, Sawtelle via San Vicente, and Riverside in 1940. When the San Bernardino Freeway opened in 1941 but was not yet connected to the Hollywood Freeway, while the "Four Way" overpass was being constructed, westbound car traffic from the SB freeway poured onto downtown streets near the present Union Station. PE's multiple car trains coming and going from Pasadena, Sierra Madre, and Monrovia/Glendora used those same streets the final few miles from private right-of-way to reach the 6th and Main PE terminal and were bogged down within this jammed traffic. Schedules could not be met, plus former patrons were now driving. The San Bernardino line, Pomona branch, Temple City branch via Alhambra's Main St., San Bernardino's Mountain View local to 34th St., Santa Monica Blvd. via Beverly Hills, and all remaining Pasadena local services were all cut in 1941. Permission was received in September 1942 to abandon the shuttle line to General Hospital which company officials said had been operating at a loss for several months.

The Glendale line survived to the early 1950s due to the convenience of a subway into downtown Los Angeles and used the company's only modern equipment, a group of streamlined PCC cars. In 1940, Pacific Electric sold its Glendale, Burbank, and Pasadena operations to Pacific City Lines. San Bernardino operations were sold to San Bernardino Valley Transit.

PE carried increased passenger loads during World War II, when Los Angeles County's population nearly doubled as war industries concentrated in the region attracting millions of workers. There were several years when the company's income statement showed a profit when gasoline and rubber were rationed and much of the populace depended on mass transit. At peak operation toward the end of the war, the PE dispatched over 10,000 trains daily and was a major employer in Southern California. However, the equipment in use was old and suffered from deferred maintenance.

The nation's last interurban Railroad post office (RPO) service was operated by PE on its San Bernardino Line. This was inaugurated comparatively late, on September 2, 1947. It left LA's new Union Station interurban yard on the west side of the terminal, turned north onto Alameda Street at 12:45 pm and reached San Bernardino at 4:40 pm, taking three hours for the trip while making postal stops en route as required. It did not operate on Sundays or holidays. This last RPO was pulled off May 6, 1950.

Aware that most new arrivals planned to stay in the region after the war, local municipal governments, Los Angeles County and the state agreed that a massive infrastructure improvement program was necessary. At that time politicians agreed to construct a web of freeways across the region. This was seen as a better solution than a new mass transit system or an upgrade of the PE.

Freeway construction 

Large-scale land acquisition for new freeway construction began in earnest in 1951. The original four freeways of the area, the Hollywood, Arroyo Seco (formerly Pasadena), Harbor, and San Bernardino, were in use or being completed. Partial completion of the San Bernardino Freeway to Aliso Street near downtown Los Angeles led to traffic chaos when inbound automobiles left the freeway and entered city streets.

The Southern District's passenger service to Santa Ana and Baldwin Park ended in 1950 as did the Northern District's Pasadena's Oak Knoll line, and the Sierra Madre line. The Western District's last line to Venice and Santa Monica also ended. The Pasadena and Monrovia/Glendora lines ended in 1951.

The various public agencies—city, county, and state—agreed with PE that further abandoning service was necessary and PE happily complied. PE management had earlier compared costs of refurbishing the Northern District interurban lines to Pasadena, Monrovia/Glendora, and Baldwin Park versus the alternative of converting to buses, and found in favor of the latter.

Remaining PE passenger service was sold off in 1953 to Metropolitan Coach Lines, which was given two years of rent-free usage of rail facilities. Jesse Haugh, of Metropolitan Coach Lines, was a former executive of Pacific City Lines which together with National City Lines acquired local streetcar systems across the country with the intention of shutting them down and converting them to bus operation in what became known as the Great American Streetcar Scandal.

Several lines operating to the north and the west which used the Belmont Tunnel from the Subway Terminal Building downtown ceased operation – the Hollywood Boulevard and Beverly Hills lines were shut down in 1954 and service to the San Fernando Valley, Burbank and Glendale using newly acquired PCC streetcars lasted only to 1955. The Bellflower line to the south closed in 1958 as the Golden State/Santa Ana (Interstate 5) neared completion.

Public ownership 
The Los Angeles Metropolitan Transit Authority was established in 1951 to study the possibility of establishing a publicly owned monorail line running north from Long Beach to downtown Los Angeles and then west to Panorama City in the San Fernando Valley. In 1954, the agency's powers were expanded to allow it to propose a more extensive regional mass-transit system. In 1957, it was given the authority to operate transit lines.

In 1958, the California state government through its Public Utility Commission took over the remaining and most popular lines from Metropolitan Coach Lines. The MTA also purchased the remaining streetcar "Yellow Car" lines of the successor of the Los Angeles Railway, then called Los Angeles Transit Lines. LARy/LATL had been purchased from the Huntington estate by National City Lines in 1945.  The MTA started operating all lines as a single system on March 3, 1958.

The Los Angeles-to-Long Beach passenger rail line served the longest, from July 4, 1902, until April 9, 1961. It was both the first and last interurban passenger line of the former Pacific Electric system. It was replaced by the Motor Coach 36f ("F" representing Freeway Flyer) route. The line, which used long stretches of open country running on private right-of-way, was later utilized when the Southern California RTD was designing and building the Metro Blue Line light rail line. The Blue Line, the first modern mass transit line in Los Angeles since the discontinuation of the Red Car service, was first opened in 1990.

The few remaining trolley-coach routes and narrow gauge streetcar routes of the former Los Angeles Railway "Yellow Cars" were removed in early 1963. The public transportation system continued to operate by the Los Angeles MTA until the agency was reorganized and relaunched as the Southern California Rapid Transit District in September 1964.

The Interstate Commerce Commission approved merger of Pacific Electric into the Southern Pacific Railroad on August 12, 1965.  Prior to the merger, PE's lucrative freight service had been by Southern Pacific diesel-electric locomotives on the heavy-duty PE rail-bed and rails and tripping the "Wig-Wag" crossing signals.

A Christmas tree lot was operated in the small stub yard at the northwest corner of Willow and Long Beach Blvd. – the stock arrived in and was stored in a steel sided box car until the Christmas trees were prepared for sale – the busy intersection was where dual trackage departed Long Beach Blvd and joined the private right-of-way from Huntington Beach and Seal Beach towards Los Angeles. The crossing signal there was the first installation of the final design of the Magnetic Watchman wigwag  crossing signal and crossbucks. Oil tank cars were still shuttled to Signal Hill even as the surface street tracks were torn up from the center of Long Beach Blvd. long after the copper overhead catenary supply wires had been removed. Southern Pacific (now part of Union Pacific) continues to operate freight service utilizing former PE right-of-way.

Post-closure

Successors 
During the 1970s, there was serious discussion about the need for additional mass transit systems based on environmental concerns, increasing population and the 1973 oil crisis. A 1974 inquiry in the Senate heard allegations about the role that General Motors and other companies, including Pacific City Lines, played in the dismantlement of streetcar systems across the United States and in particular in Los Angeles, in what became known as the Great American Streetcar Scandal. The plot of the 1988 movie Who Framed Roger Rabbit is loosely modeled on the alleged conspiracy to dismantle the streetcar lines in Los Angeles.

In 1976, the state of California formed the Los Angeles County Transportation Commission to coordinate the Southern California Rapid Transit District's (SCRTD, advertised and known locally by Angelenos as the RTD) efforts with those of various municipal transit systems in the area and to take over planning of countywide transportation systems. The SCRTD continued planning of the Metro Subway (the Red Line), while the LACTC developed plans for the light rail system. Caltrans surveyed the condition of former Pacific Electric lines in 1982. Construction began in 1985. In 1988, the two agencies formed a third entity under which all rail construction would be consolidated, and in 1993, the SCRTD and the LACTC were merged into the Los Angeles County Metropolitan Transportation Authority (LACMTA).

When the Metro Blue Line commenced commuter service in 1990 from downtown Los Angeles to Long Beach, electric rail passenger train service returned to Los Angeles, using much of the PE roadbed that ceased in 1965. Since then, the LACMTA has opened additional lines.

The Metro Red Line subway opened next in three parts between 1993 and 2000, first from Union Station in central Los Angeles connecting with short subway which forms the northern terminus of Metro Blue Line at 7th/Figueroa Metro Center station, and then west under Wilshire Blvd. onward to Western Avenue. Construction was halted in 1985 due to an unrelated explosion of methane fumes in an underground portion of a Ross Dress for Less store along the proposed route turning north at Fairfax Avenue to Hollywood, which was to service the Los Angeles County Museum of Art, Museum Row and the La Brea Tar Pits. After then-Congressman Henry Waxman banned federal funding for subway construction underneath Wilshire Blvd. past Western Avenue, the subway had to be re-routed. The second portion was the result of this: the subway now traveled north under Vermont Avenue to Hollywood Boulevard turning west to Highland Avenue. When the Hollywood Freeway was built, two PE tracks remained in the center, entering the canyon to Cahuenga Pass under the freeway at what is now the northbound Highland Avenue onramp. PE trackage continued to provide mass transit efficiently until the line was abandoned; the former roadbed was eventually converted for highway use. RTD bus service replaced rail service and remained the highest daily passenger volume corridor. When the third expansion of the Red Line subway opened, most long-distance commuter bus routes from Downtown Los Angeles to the San Fernando Valley were trimmed to connect with the new subway stations, reducing diesel fumes and motor vehicle congestion. At the northernmost Metro Red Line terminus, North Hollywood, connections can be made to several MTA bus routes of the San Fernando Valley, including several routes along the private right-of-way Metro Rapidway Metro Orange Line (route 901) dedicated exclusively for MTA vehicles that replicates many PE thru lines by transferring buses.

The Metro Green Line opened in 1995. Its right-of-way was planned from inception to be entirely isolated and protected, running in the median of Interstate 105, the Century Freeway west from Norwalk, connecting at Rosa Parks Station with Metro Blue Line, then further west to Los Angeles International Airport, and then south on elevated tracks to Redondo Beach. The Century Freeway, named for Century Blvd. the equivalent of 100th St., was the world's first freeway built to bypass and relieve traffic congestion from another freeway – the 91, Artesia Freeway. It reutilized a segment of the West Santa Ana Branch for its part of its route.

The Metro Gold Line opened in 2003, connecting downtown Los Angeles to Pasadena. Mostly at-grade, the line runs along the former Atchison, Topeka & Santa Fe Railroad (AT&SF) historic Super Chief right-of-way, which was converted to dual track overhead electric light rail. California's oldest surviving iron railroad bridge, built across the Arroyo Seco (1895), was also included in the conversion. The Gold Line Eastside Extension now connects Union Station, Downtown Los Angeles to East Los Angeles. A second extension extended east from Pasadena, again utilizing the former AT&SF right-of-way in the median of Interstate 210.

Metrolink (Southern California) provides weekday interurban commuters with high speed reversible trains – consisting of Diesel Locomotives hauling double-deck high capacity passenger cars servicing much of Los Angeles County and operating to connections in Ventura County, San Bernardino County, Riverside County, Orange County, and San Diego County as well.

 Waterfront Red Car  was a streetcar line connecting the World Cruise Center south to Ports O' Call and the 22nd St. terminal, where a shuttle bus connected other attractions along the San Pedro waterfront. Two newly constructed Red Car replicas, #500 & #501, provided service along the line on cruise ship arrival/departure days as well as weekends – Friday, Saturday and Sunday. In addition, a restored 1907-vintage Pacific Electric car, No. #1508 originally rebuilt from two wrecks as a unique motor coach, was available for special rail excursions. It began operation as a tourist attraction on July 19, 2003. The last day of service was on September 27, 2015.  The Port of Los Angeles financed, constructed and operated the replica equipment on heritage PE track, one of many of its waterfront revival projects. A new pedestrian esplanade featuring public art and fountains, sculpture and fountains was built alongside the track from the World Cruise Center to the Maritime Museum and Fire Boat Station. It connected to the Cabrillo Marine Aquarium and other San Pedro attractions when using the Waterfront Red Car trolley/shuttle. There were plans to extend the Waterfront Red Car line approximately two more miles south to the Cabrillo Marine Aquarium and the tidepools of Cabrillo Beach, which never came to pass.  Plans for an extension of the line north into Wilmington to Avalon Blvd. along existing trackage were discussed as a part of the waterfront improvement plan. These same plans led to this line being discontinued in favor of redevelopment. Some transit advocates proposed linking this line to the Metro Blue Line Long Beach terminus, a very intensive and expensive expansion.

There are several plans in motion to connect the congested West Los Angeles area with rail service. Service began on the Expo Line, a light rail line, as of April 28, 2012, to the intersection of La Cienega and Jefferson; and then as of June 20, 2012, about  further west, to the corner of National and Washington Boulevards, just east of central Culver City. In 2011 construction began on Phase Two of the Expo Line, continuing from Culver City to Santa Monica, which opened in May 2016.

Proposed developments 
More rail lines are in the planning and building stages. Light rail is being designed to connect the city center of San Bernardino with the University of Redlands via the Redlands Subdivision by 2021. It will also be the first line in the country with a zero-emission, battery-operated passenger train.

The "Foothill Extension" of the Gold Line has continued with Phase 2 to extend the service to Montclair. As of March 2020, there was some support for extending the Gold Line to Ontario International Airport, though there are neither plans nor funding for this segment as of 2022. The line opened to Azusa on March 5, 2016. The Gold Line Foothill Extension Phase 2B began construction on July 10, 2020.

In 2005, with growing congestion along Wilshire Boulevard to the Westside, then Congressman Henry Waxman introduced legislation to repeal the ban on federal dollars being used for subway tunneling underneath Wilshire Blvd he had passed 20 years earlier. The ban resulted in the Red Line subway ending at Wilshire and Western Avenue before being re-routed up Vermont Avenue towards the Valley. In 2006, the MTA renamed the line from Union Station to Wilshire/Western the Purple Line to differentiate it from the Red Line, which splits at Wilshire/Vermont. As a result, in May 2012, the MTA approved plans to extend the Purple Line to the west as far as the VA Hospital in Westwood, on an alignment mostly following Wilshire Boulevard, the city's most densely populated corridor, as was originally planned in mass transit plans designed as early as the 1920s. In 2005, Mayor Antonio Villaraigosa made as one of his most publicized campaign promises a pledge to set the wheels in motion for eventual construction of the "Subway to the Sea" as he called it. Construction finally began in 2014 on the Purple Line Extension, with the first phase to LaCienega Boulevard scheduled for completion in 2023, and full completion to the VA Hospital campus in West Los Angeles projected for the 2030s, though if additional funding can be found, the subway could be completed earlier.

Also under consideration is a new passenger rail line on the abandoned Harbor Subdivision railway corridor, connecting Carson to downtown Los Angeles via Torrance and the LA west side. Connections to the Harbor Subdivision from the World Cruise Center cruise ship terminal in the San Pedro District of Los Angeles Harbor to the Long Beach Transit Mall and the Metro Blue Line are also under evaluation.

The West Santa Ana Branch was acquired by local transit agencies with the intent to reactivate the line for rail transit. The West Santa Ana Branch Transit Corridor project aims install a new light rail line to Artesia. On the south end of the line, the Orange County Transportation Authority is constructing the OC Streetcar, a modern streetcar system expected to commence service in 2022.

Legacy 

The Pacific Electric Trail is a 21-mile (34-kilometer) rail trail that has been constructed along the former San Bernardino Line. , approximately 18 miles (29-kilometer) have been completed, from the planned western terminus at Huntington Drive in Claremont to the temporary eastern terminus at Maple Avenue in Fontana. An additional segment is planned from this point into Rialto, as well as connection to a 6.9-mile (11-kilometer) rail trail project being planned to run from Claremont to San Dimas.

Plot elements of the 1988 movie Who Framed Roger Rabbit are loosely based on folklore about the decline of streetcars in LA.

A transportation attraction based on the PE, the Red Car Trolley, is located at Disney California Adventure Park at the Disneyland Resort in Anaheim. It features two stylized replicas of PE rolling stock and is the first attraction in the park to provide transportation, running from Buena Vista Street to Guardians of the Galaxy – Mission: Breakout! in Hollywood Land, with four stations. Construction began on January 4, 2010, and the attraction opened on June 15, 2012. The Ghost Town & Calico Railroad attraction at Knott's Berry Farm uses a PE depot formerly located at Hansen station along the ROW in Stanton as the main station building. The building was moved to the theme park in 1952.

The iconic red livery of the Red Cars is also said to be the inspiration for the livery of trains on the Keikyu Railway, a commuter railway out of Tokyo with origins in an interurban line.

Routes 

Northern Division:
 Alhambra–San Gabriel
 Annandale
 Arlington–Corona
 Arrowhead
 Covina
 East Washington
 El Monte–Baldwin Park
 Highland
 Lamanda Park
 Monrovia–Glendora
 Mount Lowe
 North Lake
 Pasadena Short Line
 Pasadena via Oak Knoll
 Ontario–San Antonio Heights
 Pomona
 Pomona–Claremont
 Redlands
 Riverside–Arlington
 Riverside–Rialto
 San Bernardino–Riverside
 San Dimas
 San Dimas Local
 Shorb
 Sierra Madre
 Sierra Vista Local
 South Pasadena Local
 Upland–Ontario
 Upland–San Bernardino

Western Division:
 Brush Canyon
 Coldwater Canyon
 Echo Park Avenue
 Edendale Local
 Glendale–Burbank
 Hollywood
 Lankershim–Van Nuys
 Laurel Canyon
 Owensmouth
 Redondo Beach via Playa del Rey
 San Fernando
 Santa Monica Air Line
 Sawtelle
 Sherman
 Soldiers' Home
 Venice–Inglewood
 Venice–Playa del Rey
 Venice Short Line
 West 16th Street
 Western and Franklin Avenue
 Westgate

Southern Division:
 American Avenue
 Balboa
 Bellflower
 Catalina Dock
 East Seventh Street
 East Third Street
 Fullerton
 Hawthorne–El Nido
 Hawthorne–El Segundo
 Huntington Beach–La Bolsa
 La Habra–Fullerton–Yorba Linda
 Long Beach
 Long Beach–San Pedro
 Redondo Beach via Gardena
 San Pedro via Dominguez
 San Pedro via Gardena
 Santa Ana
 Santa Ana–Huntington Beach
 Santa Ana–Orange
 Seal Beach
 Seal Beach–Huntington Beach–Newport Beach
 Terminal Island
 Torrance
 Watts
 Whittier

Facilities 

The Pacific Electric railway electrification system was based on 600 volt direct current power delivered to cars via overhead line. The San Bernardino Line operated partially at 1200 volts DC.

Some maintenance and operational sites include:
 West Hollywood Car Barn and Yard
 Ocean Park Car Barn and Yard
 Torrance Shops
 Pacific Electric Building (6th & Main Station)
 Subway Terminal Building (4th and Hill St. Station)
 Belmont Tunnel (Hollywood Subway)
 Substation No. 8
 Substation No. 14
 Redlands Trolley Barn

Fleet 

The number of cars that Pacific Electric owned after the merger would require its own separate page.

Passenger cars

Work cars 
 LAP trolley wire greaser 1898–1957
 PE tower car 1915–1957

Locomotives 

 1600 class electric locomotives

Freight cars 
 LA&R flat-top caboose 1896
 PE flat-top caboose PE 1939
 LS&MS caboose 1915
 LV caboose 1926
 RF&P caboose 1905
 SSC box car 1924

Buses 
 GM yellow coach

See also 

 
 Belmont Tunnel
 Historic Downtown Los Angeles Streetcar
 Pacific Electric Building
 Pacific Electric Railroad Bridge
 Redlands Trolley Barn
 San Diego Electric Railway
 Streetcars in Los Angeles
 Subway Terminal Building

Notes

Bibliography

Predecessor lines

External links 
 Pacific Electric Railway system map, 1949
 Pacific Electric Railway Elec Railway Historical Association of So. California guide to PE traction heritage
 The Red Cars of Los Angeles (USC archives)
 Surviving Equipment of the Pacific Electric Railway

Photos 

 Pacific Electric Railway Historical Society Online Image Archive
 DVD Documentary – This Was Pacific Electric – Complete documentary on the Pacific Electric. Movies, stills, and interviews.
 Pacific Electric photos (Jim Stubchaer)
 Pacific Electric Subway – Toluca Portal: 1925–1955 – 2008 photos (Harry Marnell) 
 Pacific Electric Railway Monuments archival photographs
 Pacific Electric Subway photos (Elson Trinidad)
 Bill Volkmer collection of Red Car photos and post cards

 
Electric railways in California
Interurban railways in California
Light rail in California
Public transportation in Southern California
Defunct California railroads
Defunct public transport operators in the United States
Defunct companies based in Greater Los Angeles
Passenger rail transportation in California
History of Los Angeles
History of Los Angeles County, California
Public transportation in Los Angeles
Public transportation in Los Angeles County, California
Public transportation in Orange County, California
Public transportation in Riverside County, California
Public transportation in San Bernardino County, California
Transportation companies based in California
Railway companies established in 1901
1901 establishments in California
Railway companies disestablished in 1961
1961 disestablishments in California
Former Class I railroads in the United States
Predecessors of the Southern Pacific Transportation Company
Southern Pacific Railroad subsidiaries